Petersham may refer to:

Places

Australia
 Petersham, New South Wales, Australia
Petersham railway station, a station serving Petersham, Australia
Petersham RUFC, a Rugby Club in Sydney, Australia
Petersham Girls High School, a school in Petersham, New South Wales, Australia
 Electoral district of Petersham, an electoral district in New South Wales, Australia
 Petersham Parish, Cumberland, a parish in New South Wales, Australia
 Municipality of Petersham, a former government district in New South Wales
Randwick Petersham Cricket Club, a cricket club in Sydney, Australia
All Saints Anglican Church, Petersham, a church in Petersham, New South Wales, Australia

United Kingdom
 Petersham, London, United Kingdom
Petersham Parish Church, a church in Petersham, United Kingdom
Petersham Common, London, a park near Petersham, United Kingdom
Petersham Hole, a disaster in Petersham, United Kingdom
Petersham Ait, another name for Glovers Island, an island on the River Thames
Ham and Petersham Cricket Club, a cricket club in London, United Kingdom
Sudbrook Park, Petersham, a house in Petersham, United Kingdom
HMS Petersham (M2718), a former ship of the Royal Navy
Petersham Lodge, a gate of Richmond Park, London, United Kingdom

United States
 Petersham, Massachusetts, a New England town
 Petersham (CDP), Massachusetts, the central village in the town
Petersham Common Historic District, a historic district in the town
Petersham State Forest Park, a state forest park in Massachusetts

Clothing
 Petersham ribbon, a flexible corded ribbon use by milliners and tailors

People
Maud and Miska Petersham, a pair of authors
Viscount Petersham, a title given to the Earl of Harrington
Charles Stanhope, 12th Earl of Harrington
Charles Stanhope, 4th Earl of Harrington